Below is a list of television series and feature films based on characters and concepts that have appeared in Boom! Studios publications, including its various imprints. This list includes live action and animated television series and films.

Television

Live-action

Animated

Film

Live-action

Reception

Box office

Critical and public reception

References

External links
 Boom Entertainment on Internet Movie Database

Lists of films based on comics
Lists of films and television series
Lists of television series based on works